Jürgen Patocka (born 30 July 1977) is an Austrian former international footballer who managed and played for FC Egg as a left-sided central defender.

Club career
Late-developing Patocka started his professional career with Second Division outfit SC Austria Lustenau for whom he played over three seasons before making his debut in the top flight with SV Mattersburg in 2004. With Mattersburg, the tall defender lost two successive cup finals to Austria Wien and in 2007 he moved to Rapid Wien to win his first league title in 2008. Patocka returned to Austria Lustenau for the start of the 2012–13 season. He joined FC Egg in the Vorarlbergliga in 2014 as player/manager.

International career
He made his debut for Austria in a May 2007 friendly match against Scotland and was part of the Austrian squad during EURO 2008 on home soil but never figured in any of Austria's three games.

Honours
Austrian Football Bundesliga (1):
 2008

External links

Rapid stats – Rapid Archive
Player profile – EURO2008

1977 births
Living people
Footballers from Vienna
Austrian footballers
Austria international footballers
Austrian people of German descent
UEFA Euro 2008 players
SC Austria Lustenau players
SV Mattersburg players
SK Rapid Wien players
Austrian Football Bundesliga players
Association football defenders